Faisal Safa Sakhizada (born 15 June 1990) is an Afghan association footballer who currently plays for Kingston City FC, football club from Melbourne, Australia. He is also a player in the Afghanistan national football team. His position on the field is centre back defender.

Club career
Faisal debuted for Afghanistan in 2004 playing football for Pamir F.C Club, until 2007. In 2007, he played in the first league at the Kam Air F.C football team and soon after he made a transfer to the Ordu F.C, where he is currently playing. In these years the club became vice-champion of national league and champion of all Afghanistan cups. His ability in the ground spirit of the game inspired many I-League teams to transfer him. An Irani football club have also asked him to play for them, but Safa denied their request. After some interested teams informed he accepted a bid from Australian club Dandenong Thunder SC. One of the best performing Afghan players, he has been to many countries to expand his career, and is planning on continuing his dream career as a football player. After 4-years with Dandenong Thunder SC Sakhizada decide to sign a contract with Kingston City FC.

International career
Safa has represented Afghanistan in almost every youth team. He became a member of the senior team in 2010. He played 3 times in SAFF Cup, 2 times in AFC Challenge Cup and 2 times in South Asian Games. He also represented the Afghanistan national football team in the FIFA World Cup 2010 qualifiers.

References

1990 births
Living people
Footballers from Kabul
Afghan footballers
Ordu Kabul F.C. players
Dandenong Thunder SC players
Kingston City FC players
Afghan expatriate footballers
Expatriate soccer players in Australia
Association football defenders
Afghanistan international footballers